No. 158 Squadron RAF was a World War I proposed ground attack squadron that did not become operational in time to see action, and a World War II bomber squadron. After World War II had ended in Europe the squadron operated in the transport role until disbandment in December 1945.

History

Formation in World War I
No. 158 Squadron RAF was first formed on 9 May 1918, and the squadron was originally to be equipped with Sopwith Snipe fighters, but this was postponed and the squadron eventually formed at Upper Heyford on 4 September 1918, equipped with Sopwith Salamander ground attack aircraft. The squadron arrived too late to see action during the war, and disbanded on 20 November 1918.

Reformation and World War II

The squadron reformed at RAF Driffield on 14 February 1942, via the renumbering of No. 104 Squadron, which was equipped with the Vickers Wellington medium bomber and 158 sqn used these on night raids to Germany and occupied France. In June 1942 the squadron re-equipped with the Halifax B.Mk.II heavy bombers and moved to RAF East Moor. On 6 November 1942 the squadron moved to RAF Rufforth, followed by a move to RAF Lissett on 28 February 1943. In January 1944 the squadron had re-equipped with the Halifax B.Mk.III and 'C' flight was used to form No. 640 Squadron at Leconfield. By 7 May 1945 the Second World War in Europe had finished and the squadron was transferred to RAF Transport Command, re-equipped with the Short Stirling Mk.V. The squadron moved to Stradishall on 17 August 1945, where it disbanded on 31 December 1945.

One of the 158 Squadron aircraft, a Handley page Halifax B.Mk.III, serial no. LV907, coded NP-F and nicknamed "Friday the 13th", completed a remarkable 128 operational missions. Incredibly this precious aircraft was not saved from the scrapheap after being displayed on Oxford street in London. Only a section of the nose from the aircraft was saved and is exhibited at the RAF Museum Hendon. The Halifax that is displayed at the Yorkshire Air Museum is made up of parts of various aircraft and painted as LV907, in honour of the aircraft and its crew On 11 November 1945 a Stirling C.5 operated by the squadron was departing for the United Kingdom when it crashed on take off from RAF Castel Benito in Libya after the wing caught fire, 21 soldiers and five crew were killed, one person survived.

Aircraft operated

Squadron bases

Commanding officers

References

Notes

Bibliography

External links

 158 Squadron association
 Rickard, J (22 March 2007), No. 158 Squadron (RAF): Second World War
 RAF Lissett history
 International Bomber Command Centre
 Flight Officer Norman Tilston DFC RCAF 158 Squadron Tribute website

158 Squadron
Military units and formations established in 1918
Aircraft squadrons of the Royal Air Force in World War II
1918 establishments in the United Kingdom